pumilio RNA binding family member 3 (previously KIAA0020) is a protein that in humans is encoded by the PUM3 gene.

References

Further reading